The canton of Le Luc is an administrative division of the Var department, southeastern France. Its borders were modified at the French canton reorganisation which came into effect in March 2015. Its seat is in Le Luc.

It consists of the following communes:

Besse-sur-Issole
Cabasse
Le Cannet-des-Maures
Collobrières
Flassans-sur-Issole
La Garde-Freinet
Gonfaron
Le Luc
Les Mayons
Pignans
Le Thoronet

References

Cantons of Var (department)